Q'atawi Qullu (Aymara q'atawi lime, qullu mountain, "lime mountain", Hispanicized spelling Catahuicollo) is a mountain in the Peruvian Andes, about  high. It is located in the Puno Region, Azángaro Province, at the border of the districts Potoni and San Antón.

References

Mountains of Puno Region
Mountains of Peru